Matt Damon is an American actor, producer, and screenwriter. After his film debut Mystic Pizza, he began acting in supporting roles. His first film in a leading role was in the legal film The Rainmaker. He had a breakout role for the psychological film Good Will Hunting, in which he co-wrote with Ben Affleck. They won the Academy Award for Best Original Screenplay and Damon was nominated for Best Actor. He starred in the commercially successful films Saving Private Ryan and The Talented Mr. Ripley. Damon and Sean Bailey worked on the television series Project Greenlight, helping newcomers make their first film. He is an executive producer for a number of projects directed by winners of the series. Damon took on starring roles in two lucrative film franchises. He played a con man in Ocean's Trilogy and played the titular spy Jason Bourne in four films of the Bourne series. Damon starred with Casey Affleck in the drama film Gerry. He played an energy analyst in the thriller film Syriana and starred in the Academy Award winning film The Departed. He played the rugby player Francois Pienaar in the sports film Invictus and was nominated for Academy Award for Best Supporting Actor. He continued gaining praise for collaborations with Soderbergh for the films, The Informant! and Behind the Candelabra. In the former, he played the whistleblower and in the latter, he played the disgruntled lover of Liberace, for which he received an Emmy Award nomination.

Damon launched Pearl Street Films, which made its first film Promised Land. His commercial success in the 2010s came with the western film True Grit, and the science fiction films Elysium and The Martian. In the latter, which earned over $630 million to become his highest-grossing release, Damon played a botanist stranded on Mars, a role for which he received an Oscar nomination and won a Golden Globe Award for Best Actor. With box office receipts of over $3 billion in North America, Damon ranks among Hollywood's most commercially successful actors.

Film

Television

See also
List of awards and nominations received by Matt Damon

Footnotes

References

External links 

Damon, Matt
American filmographies
Filmography